Caunce is a surname. Notable people with the surname include:
 Lewis Caunce (1911–1978), English footballer
 Steve Caunce, English businessman, CEO of AO World

See also
 Cauce